Loqueffret is a commune in the Finistère department of Brittany in north-western France.

Located south of the monts d ' Arrée, in the eastern part of the Armorique regional natural park, it is a small rural village, former home of the Pilhaouers. Covering 2 770 hectares, the commune had in 2006 of 406 inhabitants. Served by a dense drainage network, it presents two distinct part geographical entities and other sandstone of the monts d ' Arrée domes: northern slopes covered wildfires down towards Lake Saint-Michel, South of the slopes in crops or afforested, more conducive to agricultural soils.

"The parish church, the chapel of the cross and the Manor of du Rusquec remain important heritage sites, while the quality and variety of natural sites, paths and panoramas favour activities related to tourism rural

Population
Inhabitants of Loqueffret are called in French Loqueffretois. In 1884 the commune of Brennilis was separated from Loqueffret.

See also

Communes of the Finistère department
Parc naturel régional d'Armorique
Loqueffret Parish close

References

External links
Official website 

Mayors of Finistère Association 

Communes of Finistère